The Roman Catholic Diocese of Łowicz is a diocese located in the city of Łowicz in the Ecclesiastical province of Łódż in Poland.

Its cathedral, the Cathedral Basilica of the Assumption of the Blessed Virgin Mary and St. Nicholas, stands as one of Poland's official national Historic Monuments (Pomnik historii), as designated November 13, 2012. This listing is maintained by the National Heritage Board of Poland.

In 2014, it became the first and for now the only one Polish diocese since a very long time where no deacon was ordinated a priest. The level of Sunday mass attendance is also lower than the Polish nation's average about 31.3% of all Catholics in the diocese, as of 2013.

History
 March 25, 1992: Established as Diocese of Łowicz from the Diocese of Łódź, Diocese of Płock and Metropolitan Archdiocese of Warszawa

Leadership
 Bishops of Łowicz (Roman rite)
 Bishop Andrzej Franciszek Dziuba (since 2004.03.27)
 Bishop Alojzy Orszulik, S.A.C. (1992.03.25 – 2004.03.27)

Reports of sex abuse
In the summer of 2020, a priest of the diocese by the name of Piotr M. was convicted of sexually molesting two girls in the village of Ruszów. Investigations revealed that there had been allegations of abuse against Piotr M. from 10 accusers dating back more than 30 years while he served in the Archdiocese of Wroclaw. Diocesan spokesman for Łowicz Fr. Jozef Lisowski says that since his conviction Piotr M. has been barred from celebrating mass or presenting himself as a priest.

See also
Roman Catholicism in Poland

References

External links
 GCatholic.org
 Catholic Hierarchy
  Diocese website

Roman Catholic dioceses in Poland
Roman Catholic Diocese of Lowicz
Christian organizations established in 1992
Roman Catholic dioceses and prelatures established in the 20th century